María Teresa Adames (born 10 September 1941) is a Mexican diver. She competed in the 1960 Summer Olympics.

References

External links
 

1941 births
Living people
Divers at the 1960 Summer Olympics
Mexican female divers
Olympic divers of Mexico
Divers from Mexico City
Pan American Games bronze medalists for Mexico
Pan American Games medalists in swimming
Divers at the 1959 Pan American Games
Divers at the 1963 Pan American Games
Medalists at the 1963 Pan American Games
20th-century Mexican women
21st-century Mexican women